The Departmental Council of Eure-et-Loir is the deliberative assembly of the Eure-et-Loir department in the region of Centre-Val de Loire. It consists of 30 members (departmental councilors) from 15 cantons.

The President of the Departmental Council is Christophe Le Dorven.

Vice-Presidents 
The President of the Departmental Council is assisted by 7 vice-presidents chosen among the departmental councilors. Each of them has a delegation of authority.

References

See also 

 Eure-et-Loir
 Departmental council (France)
 Departmental Council of Eure-et-Loir (official website)

Eure-et-Loir
Eure-et-Loir
Centre-Val de Loire